Coenagrion australocaspicum is a species of damselfly in the family Coenagrionidae. It is found in Azerbaijan and Iran. Its natural habitats are rivers, swamps, and freshwater marshes. It is threatened by habitat loss.

References

Coenagrionidae
Insects described in 1995
Taxonomy articles created by Polbot